Vaachalam is a 1997 Indian Malayalam language film, directed by Biju Varkey. The film stars Manoj K. Jayan, Thilakan, KPAC Lalitha and Nedumudi Venu. The film has musical score by Johnson.

Cast
 
Manoj K. Jayan as Sekharankutty 
Maathu as Meenakshi
Gautami as Radha
KPAC Lalitha as Vilasini
Shiju as Vinod
Nedumudi Venu as Mashu
Kamalroy as Kuttan
Kalabhavan Mani as Appukuttan
Thilakan as Ashan
Aboobacker as Narayanan
Indrans as Vasu
Cherthala Lalitha as Radha's mother
Salu Kuttanadu as Balloon seller

Soundtrack
The music was composed by Johnson.

References

External links
 

1997 films
1990s Malayalam-language films